Sangavin (also Romanized as Sangāvīn and Sangābīn) is a village in Shahidabad Rural District, Central District, Avaj County, Qazvin Province, Iran. At the 2006 census, its population was 296, in 75 families.

References 

Populated places in Avaj County